Miracle Hot Springs (formerly, Hobo Hot Springs; also known as Compressor Hot Springs and Clear Creek Hot Springs) is an unincorporated community in the Kern River Valley, in Kern County, California.

The earliest known name for this hot spring was Compressor, named after a turbine built by an indigenous miner. The turbine was supplied with water from Clear Creek that drove a compressor that provided air to miners working underground.

The name Hobo was based on the rancher's name for the workmen who lived there, who were accused of stealing sheep and cattle. Another account of the name Hobo Hot Springs claims that a hobo camp that included several bathhouses was built in 1901 when the Borel power plant was under construction.

History
In 1927, a hotel was constructed on land leased from the U.S. Forest Service.

The Hobo Hot Springs post office opened in 1932, and changed its name to Miracle Hot Springs in 1947. The post office operated for 50 years.

In 1933 a two-lane highway was built, the nearby Delongha Hot Springs resort went defunct, whereas Miracle Hot Springs flourished.

The hotel burned down in 1975, leaving only the rock soaking pools. In 1976, a 4-lane highway was built, cutting off access to the springs. What was left of the hot springs resort fell into disrepair, and was closed.

The hot springs were closed by the Kern County Health Department because the water is high in uranium and radon.

Uranium mine
The Miracle Hot Springs uranium mine, also known as the Miracle Mine, is located one mile west of Miracle Hot Springs. In 1954 uranium deposits were found by the prospector Henry Brooks Mann and his associates. The highest radiation counts detected were 6,000 counts per second (background rate: 160 counts per second.) Robert Martin of Miracle Hot Springs owned the Last Chance prospect, one mile east of Miracle Hot Springs. It primarily contained tungsten, and also held low-grade radioactive minerals ten times above background counts. Geologists believe the uranium in the area to be "related to the thermal springs of the area", however D.E. White in 1956 stated that "hot-spring water generally contains less uranium than many other types of water." A 1960 publication of the Atomic Energy Commission states that  most of the springs in the area are not radioactive.

Water profile
The hot springs water emerges from the ground at 119 °F / 48 °C at a rate of 150 gallons per minute.

See also
List of hot springs in the United States

References

Springs of California
Unincorporated communities in Kern County, California
Kern River Valley
Populated places in the Sierra Nevada (United States)
Unincorporated communities in California